Kurdistan Socialist Democratic Party is a political party in Kurdistan Region. The first leader was Saleh Yousefi after 1981. After 1992, the party was led by Mahmoud Othman. The party is currently led by Mohammed Haji Mahmoud. It is a splinter of the Kurdistan Democratic Party.

In the 2013 Kurdistan Region parliamentary election the party got 12,501 votes (0.6%) and it won one seat in the Kurdistan National Assembly.

Paramilitary wing
The Kurdistan Socialist Democratic Party also has a paramilitary wing of Peshmerga soldiers under the direct command of party leader Mohammed Haji Mahmood, whose nom de guerre is "Kaka Hama". The party's forces have fought in the Iraqi Civil War against the Islamic State of Iraq and the Levant (ISIL), mostly in the region south of Kirkuk. They also took part in the Mosul offensive (2016). Among the party fighters killed in combat against ISIL was Mohammed Haji Mahmood's son Atta.

References

1976 establishments in Iraq
Kurdish nationalism in Iraq
Kurdish nationalist political parties
Kurdish political parties in Iraq
Political parties established in 1976
Political parties in Kurdistan Region
Social democratic parties in Iraq